Big Vein may refer to:

Big Vein, Virginia, an unincorporated community
The Big Vein, a seam of coal in Maryland